Iolaus normani, the Norman's sapphire, is a butterfly in the family Lycaenidae. It is found in Guinea and Nigeria. The habitat consists of dry forests in Guinea savanna.

Adults of both sexes mud-puddle.

Subspecies
Iolaus normani normani (Nigeria: Anara Forest Reserve)
Iolaus normani meamui Collins & Larsen, 2005 (Guinea: Fouta Djalon)

References

Butterflies described in 1986
Iolaus (butterfly)